Grand Desert may refer to the following places:
Grand Desert, Nova Scotia, Canada
Grand Désert in Switzerland